The first election to Merthyr Tydfil County Borough Council following the re-organization of local government in Wales was held on 4 May 1995. It was followed by the 1999 elections. On the same day there were elections to  the other 21 local authorities in Wales and community councils in Wales. Labour won a vast majority of the seats.

Overview
All council seats were up for election. These were the first elections held following local government reorganisation and the abolition of Mid Glamorgan County Council. The ward boundaries for the new authority were based on the previous Merthyr Tydfil Borough Council.

|}

Results

Bedlinog (two seats)

Cyfarthfa (three seats)

Dowlais (four seats)

Gurnos (four seats)

Merthyr Vale (two seats)

Park (three seats)

Penydarren (three seats)

Plymouth (three seats)

Town (four seats)

Treharris (four seats)

Vaynor (two seats)

References

1995
1995 Welsh local elections